Saqra Waqra (Quechua saqra malignant, pernicious, bad, bad tempered, wicked; restless; devil, synonym of supay, waqra horn, "devil's horn", also spelled Sagra Huagra) is a mountain in the Andes of Peru which reaches a height of approximately . It is located in the Huánuco Region, Dos de Mayo Province, Marías District. Saqra Waqra lies southwest of a lake named Ñat'inqucha.

References

Mountains of Peru
Mountains of Huánuco Region